In Gaelic football, St. Vincent's were the defending champions in the Dublin Senior Football Championship after winning the Dublin Championship in 2013 and 2014. Castleknock played in the 2015 Senior Championship after winning the 2014 Dublin Intermediate Football Championship.

Round 1
The first round began on 6 May 2015 with five games. A further four games were played on 7 May with a facile win for last years finalists St. Oliver Plunkett's Eoghan Ruadh as the standout fixture. On 8 May, several games were cancelled due to weather conditions although, two games did go ahead with wins for Clontarf and Na Fianna. Parnells, Naomh Maur, Erins Isle,  Whitehall Colmcille, Round Towers Clondalkin, O'Toole's, St. Peregrines, Thomas Davis, Fingal Ravens, St. Mary's, Cuala, Castleknock and Templeogue Synge Street were all knocked out in the first round. All the losing teams go on to play in the Dublin Senior B Football Championship and the winning teams progress to the second round of the Dublin Senior Football Championship.

Second round

Quarter finals

Semi finals

Final

References

External links
Dublin GAA Fixtures & Results
Live Updates and Scores

Dublin Senior Football Championship
Dublin Senior Football Championship